Mike Getchell is a retired American soccer midfielder who played professionally in the Western Soccer Alliance, Mexican Primera División, Major Indoor Soccer League and American Professional Soccer League.  He is the Managing Director Latin America for DHR International.

Youth
Born in the United States, Getchell spent much of his youth in Brazil where his Episcopalian father was serving. Government unrest forced the Getchells to leave Brazil and they moved to Portland, Oregon, before settling in northern California for Mike's senior year of high school.  Getchell Trained with the Golden Gate Gales (ASL) youth team, and played for the Berkley Mavericks soccer club where he was approached by Sigi Schmid.  He attended UCLA, playing on the men's soccer team from 1981 to 1985.  He lost the entire 1983 season due to injury.  In 1985, Getchell and his teammates won the NCAA Men's Division I Soccer Championship.  He graduated with a bachelor's degree in political science and international relations.  Getchell later earned an MBA through a joint degree program run by Business School São Paulo and the University of Toronto.

Professional
In 1986, Getchell turned professional with the Hollywood Kickers of the Western Soccer Alliance.  In June 1986, the Tacoma Stars selected Getchell in the second round of the Major Indoor Soccer League draft.  However, a torn anterior cruciate ligament prevented him from playing for over a year.  He spent the 1987-1988 MISL season in Tacoma.  In 1988, he played for the San Jose Earthquakes.  During his time in San Jose, teammates Tomás Boy and Francisco Javier Cruz recommended him to C.F. Monterrey of the Mexican Primera División.  Getchell played the 1988-1989 season in Monterrey where he became the first native-born American to play in the modern era.  A coaching change led to Getchell falling out of the lineup and in the 1989-1990 pre-season, Monterrey released him.  He returned to the United States and joined the Atlanta Attack of the American Indoor Soccer Association.  In 1990, he played for the Los Angeles Heat in the American Professional Soccer League.  In 1991, he finished his career with the Colorado Foxes.

References

External links
 MISL: Mike Getchell
 Before Gomez, Torres, the first gringo pioneer in Mexico

Living people
1963 births
Soccer players from Oregon
American expatriate soccer players
American Indoor Soccer Association players
American Professional Soccer League players
Atlanta Attack players
Colorado Foxes players
California Kickers players
Los Angeles Heat players
Major Indoor Soccer League (1978–1992) players
C.F. Monterrey players
Liga MX players
San Jose Earthquakes (1974–1988) players
UCLA Bruins men's soccer players
Western Soccer Alliance players
Expatriate footballers in Mexico
Sportspeople from Lake Oswego, Oregon
American soccer players
Association football midfielders